Bobiri is a town in the Kwabre East District of the Ashanti Region noted for Bobiri Butterfly Sanctuary.

References

See also
Adanwomase

Populated places in the Ashanti Region